Rasbora gerlachi is a species of cyprinid fish in the genus Rasbora.

References

Rasboras
Taxa named by Ernst Ahl
Fish described in 1928